The European College Dukagjini (Albanian: Kolegji Evropian Dukagjini), formerly known as European Vision University, is an institution of higher education in Kosovo.

Notes and references
Notes:

External links
 Official site

Educational institutions established in 1995
Universities and colleges in Kosovo
Peja
1995 establishments in Yugoslavia